Time Machine may refer to:
 Time machine, a fictional or hypothetical device used to achieve time travel

Film and television
 The Time Machine (1960 film), a film by George Pal
 The Time Machine (1978 film), a made-for-television version
 Time Machine: The Journey Back, a 1993 documentary film
 The Time Machine (2002 film), a film by Simon Wells
 Time Machine (unfinished film), an unfinished Bollywood science-fiction film
 Time Machine (game show), a 1985 American television game show
 "Time Machine" (Cow and Chicken), a 1997 episode
 "Time Machine" (Beavis and Butt-Head), a 2011 episode
 "Time Machine" (The Brak Show), a 2001 episode

Literature
 The Time Machine, an 1895 novel by H. G. Wells
 Time Machine (short story series), a 1959–1989 series of stories published in Boys' Life magazine 
 Time Machine (novel series), a 1984–1989 series of children's adventures
 The Time Machine, an audiobook in the Doctor Who: Destiny of the Doctor series

Music
Time Machine (Russian band) or Mashina Vremeni, a Russian rock band formed in 1969
Time Machine (hip hop group)

Albums
 The Time Machine (soundtrack), the soundtrack of the 2002 film
 The Time Machine (Gary Burton album) (1965)
 Time Machine (Nektar album)
 The Time Machine (Alan Parsons album) (1999)
 Time Machine (Joe Satriani album) and its title track, (1993)
 Time Machine (Rick Wakeman album),  1988
 Time Machine (video), a video by Dio

Songs
 Time Machine (composition), an orchestral piece composed by Michael Daugherty
 "Time Machine" (Girls' Generation song)
 "Time Machine" (Alicia Keys song)
 "Time Machine", a 1971 song by Beggars Opera from Waters of Change
 "Time Machine", a 1992 song by Black Sabbath from Dehumanizer
 "Time Machine", a 1997 song by Chara from Junior Sweet.
 "Time Machine", a 2009 song by Cracker from Sunrise in the Land of Milk and Honey
 "Time Machine", a 1969 song by Grand Funk Railroad from On Time
 "Time Machine", a 2009 song by WaterFlame from Geometry Dash 
 "Time Machine", a 2000 song by Heavenly from Coming from the Sky
 "Time Machine", a 2010 song by Robyn from Body Talk
 "Time Machine", a 2014 song by Ingrid Michaelson from Lights Out
 "Time Machine", a 2007 song by T-Pain from Epiphany
 "Time Machine", a 2012 song by ミラクルミュージカル from Hawaii: Part II
 "Time Machine", a 1970 song by Mick Softley
 "The Time Machine", a 2021 song by Iron Maiden from Senjutsu

Other uses
 Time Machine (macOS), a backup utility for macOS
 Time Machine (roller coaster), a roller coaster at Freestyle Music Park in Myrtle Beach, South Carolina
 Time Machine VR, a 2016 adventure simulation video game by Minority Media

See also

Time travel (disambiguation)
Time Traveler (disambiguation)
Wayback Machine